This is a complete list of members of the United States Senate during the 60th United States Congress listed by seniority, from March 4, 1907, to March 3, 1909.

Order of service is based on the commencement of the senator's first term. After this is former service as a senator and then alphabetical order.

Senators whose service began in the middle of the Congress are listed at the end of the list with no number.

Terms of service

U.S. Senate seniority list

See also
60th United States Congress
List of members of the United States House of Representatives in the 60th Congress by seniority

Notes

External links
Senate Seniority List

060
Senate Seniority